Lupinus holmgrenianus is a species of lupine known by the common name Holmgren's lupine. It is native to the desert mountains of western Nevada and a few ranges of adjacent Inyo County, California, including the Last Chance Range of Death Valley National Park. This is a hairy perennial herb growing erect to a maximum height near . The inflorescence is a spiral of flowers each just over a centimeter long. They are purple in color with yellow patches on their banners. The fruit is a hairy legume pod 4 or 5 centimeters long.

References

External links
Jepson Manual Treatment

holmgrenianus
Flora of California
Flora of Nevada